Caleb Rodney Layton (September 8, 1851 – November 11, 1930) was an American physician and politician, from Georgetown, in Sussex County, Delaware. He was a member of the Republican Party, who served two terms as U. S. Representative from Delaware.

Early life and family
Layton was born at Long Farm, near Frankford, Sussex County, Delaware, son of Samuel H. and Elizabeth Long Layton. He was the great-grandson of Delaware governor Caleb Rodney His father was a farmer, who had served as Sheriff, Justice of the Peace and Clerk of the Court of Sussex County. Caleb Layton attended Georgetown Academy and Amherst College in Massachusetts, graduating in 1873. Subsequently he attended the medical school at the University of Pennsylvania in Philadelphia and received his degree in 1876. In 1906 he married Anna Elizabeth Sipple and they had three children, Rachel Sipple, Daniel John, and Caleb Sipple.

Professional and political career
Returning to Sussex County, Layton settled in Georgetown and began the practice of medicine. His first position in the political sphere was as the Secretary of the Republican County Committee, which he held from 1876 to 1888. He was Chairman of the Union (Addicks) Republican Party County Committee from 1896 to 1901 and also served as one of Delaware's ten delegates to the Republican National Conventions in the years 1896, 1900 and 1904. Meanwhile, from 1897 until 1905, he was editor of the Union Republican, a Georgetown newspaper.

Withdrawing completely from his medical practice, Layton was appointed Delaware Secretary of State in 1901, and served until 1905. For the next four years he was appointed as an auditor for the U.S. State Department in Washington, D.C. From 1912 until 1918 he was a member of the Progressive Republican Party State committee.

Layton was elected to the U.S. House of Representatives in 1918, defeating incumbent Democratic U.S. Representative Albert F. Polk. He won election again in 1920, this time defeating Democrat James R. Clements. During these terms, he served in the Republican majority in the 66th and 67th Congress. Seeking reelection in 1922, he lost to Democrat William H. Boyce, a retired judge from Georgetown. Layton served two terms, from March 4, 1919 until March 3, 1923, during the administrations of U.S. Presidents Woodrow Wilson and Warren G. Harding. He was voted out of office due to his voting against the Dyer Anti-Lynching Bill. Alice Dunbar Nelson, an African American political activist and founder of the Anti-Lynching Crusaders, assisted 12,000 new voters who supported the bill to register in Delaware. Layton ultimately lost the election by 7000 votes, which was equal to the number of black voters who voted for his opponent in protest.

Death and legacy
Layton then resumed the practice of medicine in Georgetown, Delaware. He died there and is buried in the St. Paul's Episcopal Churchyard at Georgetown. His son, Daniel J. Layton, later became Attorney General of Delaware and then Chief Justice of the Delaware Supreme Court.

Almanac
Elections are held the first Tuesday after November 1. U.S. Representatives took office March 4 and have a two-year term.

References

External links
Biographical Directory of the United States Congress
Delaware's Members of Congress

Political Graveyard

Places with more information
Delaware Historical Society; website; 505 North Market Street, Wilmington, Delaware 19801; (302) 655-7161
University of Delaware; Library website; 181 South College Avenue, Newark, Delaware 19717; (302) 831-2965
Newark Free Library 750 Library Ave., Newark, Delaware (302) 731-7550.

1851 births
1930 deaths
People from Georgetown, Delaware
Amherst College alumni
Perelman School of Medicine at the University of Pennsylvania alumni
Secretaries of State of Delaware
Burials in Sussex County, Delaware
Republican Party members of the United States House of Representatives from Delaware